The 4 × 10 kilometre relay cross-country skiing at the 1980 Winter Olympics in Lake Placid, New York, United States was held on Wednesday 20 February at the Mount Van Hoevenberg. It was the tenth appearance of the 4 × 10 km relay in the Winter Olympics.

It was the third time that Soviet Union won the gold medal in the event. Norway finished second in the relay, Finland in third place.

Results
Sources:

References

External links
Results International Ski Federation (FIS)

Men's cross-country skiing at the 1980 Winter Olympics
Men's 4 × 10 kilometre relay cross-country skiing at the Winter Olympics